The Christopher & Dana Reeve Foundation is a charitable organization  headquartered in Short Hills, New Jersey, dedicated to finding treatments and cures for paralysis caused by spinal cord injury and other neurological disorders.

The organization's mission statement states, "The Christopher & Dana Reeve Foundation is dedicated to curing spinal cord injury by funding innovative research, and improving the quality of life for people living with paralysis through grants, information and advocacy." Since 1982, it has distributed over $138 million to spinal cord researchers, and $28 million to nonprofits that aim to support better quality-of-life for people with disabilities.

History 
The foundation was started in 1982 by Henry Stifel, whose son had been injured in a motor vehicle accident. Its original name was the Stifel Paralysis Research Foundation, and it was later renamed the American Paralysis Association (APA). In 1995, the actor Christopher Reeve became quadriplegic as a result of a horse riding accident. Reeve sought out the help of the APA and raised funds for it. In 1996, the foundation was renamed the Christopher Reeve Paralysis Foundation and then the Christopher Reeve Foundation.

After Reeve's death in October 2004, his widow, Dana Reeve, assumed the chairmanship of the Foundation. Dana Reeve herself died 17 months later, in March 2006, of lung cancer.

On March 11, 2007, the Foundation announced that it had changed its name to the Christopher & Dana Reeve Foundation on the first anniversary of Dana Reeve's death. As of 2020, all three of Christopher and Dana Reeve's children serve on the foundation's board of directors.

See also 
 Spinal cord injury research
 Rehabilitation in spinal cord injury

References

External links
 Official website

Neurology organizations
Organizations established in 1982
Health charities in the United States
Superman
1982 establishments in New Jersey
Charities based in New Jersey
Disability organizations based in the United States
Medical and health organizations based in New Jersey